Cô Tô may refer to several places in Vietnam:

Cô Tô District, a rural district of Quảng Ninh Province
Cô Tô (island), an island in Cô Tô District
Cô Tô (township), the capital of Cô Tô District
Cô Tô, An Giang, a commune of Tri Tôn District